Patriarch Callinicus I may refer to:

 Callinicus I of Constantinople, Ecumenical Patriarch in 693–705
 Kalinik I, Patriarch of the Serbs in 1691–1710
 Patriarch Callinicus of Alexandria, Greek Patriarch of Alexandria in 1858–1861